Arjun is a 2004 Indian Telugu-language action drama film written and directed by Gunasekhar and produced by G. Ramesh Babu. The film starred Mahesh Babu as the titular character along with Shriya Saran, Keerthi Reddy, Raja Abel, Prakash Raj, and Saritha. The music was composed by Mani Sharma with cinematography by Sekhar V. Joseph and editing by A. Sreekar Prasad. The film released on 18 August 2004 and was successful at the box-office. It was later dubbed into Hindi as Maidan-E-Jung (2008) and in Tamil as Varenda Maduraikku. The film was screened at the International Film Festival of India in the mainstream section. This was Keerthi Reddy's final acting performance prior to her retirement from the film industry. The film won three Nandi Awards.

Plot 
Arjun and his twin sister Meenakshi finish college, and their parents decide to look for a good man to marry Meenakshi. Meenakshi shows Arjun a letter from their friend Uday, who confesses his love for her and asks her to elope with him as his parents Bala Nayagar and Andal are arranging his marriage with a different girl. Meenakshi tells Arjun that she, too, is interested in Uday. Arjun goes to Madurai, where Uday lives with his parents and is about to get married. Arjun tells Uday's parents about the letter and asks for their consent for marriage. Uday dares to marry Meenakshi before their parents' approval comes. Uday's parents agree for Meenakshi as their daughter-in-law, though they have different plans in mind.

Meanwhile, Arjun meets Roopa, who also happens to be from Madurai, and they fall for each other. In Meenakshi's house, Uday's parents plan to kill her as they had lost a chance to grab a millionaire's property by an arranged marriage. They make multiple attempts to kill Meenakshi, but she survives. Arjun comes to the conclusion that they are trying to kill his sister, but Uday and Meenakshi do not believe him. At last, Meenakshi believes him when they try to kill her while Uday was away. She escapes with Arjun and Roopa's help and gives birth to twins. In that fight, Bala dies, and Andal develops paralysis. Uday watches how they tried to kill Meenakshi and believes Arjun's version. They all reconcile and live peacefully.

Cast

Production
The film was produced by Mahesh's brother Ramesh. This was Mahesh's last film released before he married Namratha Shirodhkar. On the other hand, this was the first movie (and the last as of July 2008) for Keerthi Reddy after her marriage. The film was launched at Padmalaya Studios in Hyderabad on 18 July 2003, to which the whole unit of the film attended. The Technical team, except for Art and Lyrics, were retained from Mahesh-Gunasekhar's previous film, Okkadu. The Filming had a single schedule which started from 18 July itself. Mahesh played a role similar to the one he played in Okkadu, while Shriya Saran was hired as the heroine opposite him. Keerthi Reddy played the role of Mahesh's sister and paired with Raja in the film. Prakash Raj played the role of Bala Nayakar, the last heir of the Nayakar dynasty who were well known in the History of Madurai while Saritha made a comeback to Telugu cinema after 16 years in the role of Andal, the wife of Nayakar.

The main attraction of the film was the colossal set of Madurai Meenakshi Temple created by art director Padma Sri Thotta Tharani. Its details were revealed on 29 September 2003 by the production unit via a press meet. Thotta Tharani, along with the director and his team, stayed in Madurai Meenakshi Temple for 15 days. He drew his sketches to the minute details and replicated them in Hyderabad. The initial estimate of the Temple set cost was  2.5 crores which were supposed to be built in three months. But, it took six months with over 500 workers constructing the set. The total cost of this set turned out to be  4 crores. This set was constructed in a 5-acre space of Padmalaya Studios near Gandipet. This set consist of Gaali Gopuram, Pond and Garbhagudi. The set had a lifetime of 3 years with resistance to all types of climatic conditions. Thotta Tharani used 90 tons of iron in the construction of this temple set for longevity. 90 tons of iron itself cost around 42 lakhs. The pond in the temple has a depth of 3 feet. It took five days of continuous filling using five motors to fill the water. The Gaali Gopuram is of 130 feet, which is equivalent to the original Gaali Gopuram at Madurai temple. A set of temple priests from Madurai came to this set and installed a replica idol of Meenakshi Amman in the Garbhagudi. This traditional installation took 8 hours (from 6 am to 2 pm). Gunasekhar used 25 powerful generation sets for a song to be shot in the temple in night effect.

Another set for the exterior of Prakash Raj's house and the streets of Madurai were also created at Padmalaya studios of Gandipet. The shooting happened at Padmalaya Studios in these sets for 60 Days which was equivalent to 40% of the film's shoot. The song Madura Madura was shot in Day effect while Dum Dumaare was shot in Night Effect at Madurai Temple set.

Soundtrack 

This film consists of 6 songs, all composed by Mani Sharma: All the Songs were written By Veturi.

Awards
Filmfare Awards South'''
 Keerthi Reddy - Filmfare Award for Best Supporting Actress – Telugu

Nandi Awards
Best Art Director – Thota Tharani
Special Jury Awards – Mahesh Babu & Saritha

References

External links

2004 films
2000s Telugu-language films
Indian action drama films
2000s masala films
Films directed by Gunasekhar
Films set in Madurai
Films scored by Mani Sharma
2004 action drama films